Deborah Palmer (born 27 February 1957) is an Australian former swimmer. She competed in four events at the 1972 Summer Olympics.

References

External links
 

1957 births
Living people
Australian female backstroke swimmers
Australian female freestyle swimmers
Olympic swimmers of Australia
Swimmers at the 1972 Summer Olympics
Place of birth missing (living people)